Olivehill, also known as Olive Hill, is an unincorporated community in Hardin County, Tennessee. Olivehill is located on U.S. Route 64 and Tennessee State Route 15, east of Savannah and west of Waynesboro.

Until the 2000 census, Olive Hill was also a census county division (CCD) for the U.S. Census.  In the 2010 U.S. Census, CCDs for Tennessee were converted to minor civil divisions (MCDs) based on county commissioner districts.

References

Unincorporated communities in Hardin County, Tennessee
Unincorporated communities in Tennessee